Matteo Montani is a contemporary Italian painter and sculptor born in Rome in 1972.

Biography 
Matteo Montani completed his classical studies in Rome prior to joining the Academy of the Arts of Rome in the Painting and Sculpture sections, where he qualified in 1997. Between 1988 and 1996, Montani worked as an assistant in Alfredo Pirri’s studio. As a student he helped artists Günther Förg and Michelangelo Pistoletto in the preparation of their exhibitions.

Following his first gallery exhibition held in Milan at the Studio Casoli in 2000, Montani won the Suzzara Prize in Italy and the next year he was the Winner of the national selection in the Biennale of Young Artists from Europe and the Mediterranean held in Sarajevo, Bosnia and Herzegovina. In the following years, a number of Italian galleries held several solo exhibitions of Montani’s works, most notably Fabio Sargentini’s historical gallery L’Attico, presenting works by Gilbert & George, Joseph Beuys, Jannis Kounellis, Gino De Dominicis or Sol LeWitt. In 2008, Montani took part in the Rome Quadriennale.

Over 2010 and 2011, Matteo Montani also exhibited his production abroad in solo exhibitions in Greece with the Kalfayan Gallery, in New York at the Casa Italiana Zerilli-Marimò and in several German cities, amongst which Würzburg at the Museum Am Dom for his 2011 Seelenlandschaft exhibition featuring monumental paintings.

Montani has taken part in many group exhibitions with artists such as Mimmo Paladino, Markus Lüpertz, Mark Francis, Jannis Kounellis, Vasco Bendini, Ian Davenport, and international art fairs such as Bologna Arte Fiera, Turin Artissima, Art Los Angeles, Pulse Miami, Art Dubai, while his collaboration with well-established galleries has grown - the Marilena Bonomo Gallery
for exhibitions with Kiki Smith, sculptor James Brown, photographer Elger Esser, the Otto Gallery, or the PACI Contemporary gallery. He was also invited to exhibit in several museums, most notably the Museum of Art of Ravenna MAR. In 2013 he won the Jury Special Prize of the Premio Michetti.

In 2014 the National Gallery of Modern Art of Rome acquired for its permanent collection a wax installation previously exhibited (and partially melted in the course of the exhibition) during his 2014 solo exhibition Andarsene at the H.C. Andersen Museum, Rome.

Since 2015 Luca Tommasi’s Milan-based gallery has exhibited Montani’s works in Italy, alongside other artists such as Alexis Harding, Philip Taaffe, Alberto di Fabio, Paul Jenkins

Main exhibitions 
2017 Unfolding, Galleria Nicola Pedana, Caserta, Italy, The Glow and The Glare, Luca Tommasi Arte Contemporanea Gallery, Milan, Italy
2016 Racconto Rosso, Fabio Sargentini-L'Attico, Rome, Italy.
2016 Once Upon a Time Life, Again, The Elkon Gallery, New York, USA.,
2015 Things Behind, Luca Tommasi Arte Contemporanea Gallery, Milan, Italy., Matteo Montani (con Peter Flaccus), the Otto Gallery, Bologna, Italy
2014 Andarsene, Museo H.C.Andersen, Roma, Italy
2012 Bendini-Montani, Museo Carichieti, Chieti, Italy, I luoghi del’immagine (con Marco Grimaldi), Gallery Morone, Milan, Italy
2011 Seelenlandschaft, Museum am Dom, Würzburg, Germany
2010 Il guardiano della soglia, Kalfayan Galleries, Athens, Greece, Matteo Montani, Casa Italiana Zerilli-Marimò, USA, A cielo aperto, Otto Gallery, Bologna, Italy, Naturaldurante, Gallery Marilena Bonomo, Bari, Italy
2009 Abbassare il cielo agli occhi, The PACI Contemporary gallery, Brescia, Italy
2008 15th Rome Quadriennale, Il bacio e altre strade per le stelle", Gallery Valentina Bonomo, Rome, Italy, Matteo Montani", Ravenna Art Museum, Ravenna, Italy
2007 Foster, Gallery L’Attico- Fabio Sargentini, Rome, Italy
2005 Passerò per via Nicolò dell’Arca, Marilena Bonomo Gallery, Bari, Italy

Main galleries and museums 
2017 Galleria Nicola Pedana, Caserta, Italy
2007/2015/2016 Fabio Sargentini-L’Attico Gallery, Rome, Italy
2016 The Elkon Gallery, New York City, United States
2015/2017 Luca Tommasi Gallery, Milan, Italy
2014 H.C. Andersen Museum, Rome, Italy
2012 Con Vasco Bendini The Carichieti Foundation Museum, Chieti, Italy
2011 Museum Am Dom Würzburg, Würzburg, Germany
2010/2014 Otto Gallery, Bologna, Italy
2010 The Zerilli-Marimò Foundation, New York, USA
2010 Kalfayan Galleries, Athens, Greece
2008 MAR Ravenna, Italy
2008 Valentina Bonomo Gallery, Rome, Italy
2005 Marilena Bonomo Gallery, Bari, Italy

Main collections 
 The National Gallery of Modern Art  Rome, Italy
 Unicredit Milan, Italy
 Artefiera Bologna, Italy
 Collezione Benetton Trevise, Italy
 Fondazione La Quadriennale Rome, Italy
 MAR, Ravenna Italy
 The VAF Foundation Italy
 Museum Burg Miltenberg, Germany
 Museum Am Dom Würzburg, Germany
 Novartis Corporated Whippanny (New Jersey), USA

Prizes and awards 
2013 Premio Michetti, Italy, Winner of the Special Jury Prize
2009 Terna Award 02, Italy, Finalist
2008 Cairo Award, Milan, Italy, Finalist
2008 Talent Prize, Rome, Italy, Finalist 
2007 Lissone Award, Lissone, Italy, Finalist
2001 Biennale of Young Artists from Europe and the Mediterranean, Sarajevo, Bosnia and Herzegovina, Winner in the national selection
2000 XL Suzzara Prize, Suzzara, Italy, Winner

External links 
 www.matteomontani.com
 Live Performance of a Vanishing Painting by Matteo Montani, ARTNEWS, RAi 3, 27/10/2011 
 Matteo Montani: Sotto la superficie, a RAi documentary on Matteo Montani, 2014
 Trailer of Montani’s solo exhibition THINGS BEHIND, 2015, at Luca Tommasi Arte Contemporanea’s gallery 
 Trailer of Montani’s solo exhibition SEELENLANDSCHAFT, 2011, Museum Am Dom, Würzburg, Germany
 Trailer of Montani’s group exhibition PINO PINELLI DUETS, 2015 with Pino Pinelli, Anne Blanchet, Enzo Cacciola, Alberto Di Fabio and Chiara Dynys at Luca Tommasi Arte Contemporanea’s gallery
 Trailer of Montani’s exhibition I LUOGHI DELL’IMMAGINE with Marco Grimaldi, 2012, Nuova Galleria Morone

References 

Living people
1972 births
20th-century Italian painters
Italian male painters
Italian contemporary artists
21st-century Italian painters
20th-century Italian male artists
21st-century Italian male artists